Islam in Bengal may refer to:

Bengali Muslims, an ethnic religious population
Islam in Bangladesh, the world's third largest Muslim majority country
Islam in West Bengal, home to three Bengali Muslim majority districts
Islam in Assam, home to a significant Bengali Muslim population